Climate Emergency is being declared in Australia similarly to many other jurisdictions across the world (actions known as Climate emergency declaration). One such jurisdiction in Australia, Darebin City Council, was the first one in the world to declare a climate emergency in 2016.
This page lists all known climate emergency declarations within Australian jurisdictions across all three levels of government in Australia (Local, State, and Federal).

Federal 
There is currently no declaration of a climate emergency at the Federal level in Australia, although there have been multiple motions moved to declare one.

In October 2019, the Australian Labor Party supported the Australian Greens Party's motion to declare a climate emergency. The motion was additionally supported by crossbenchers Zali Steggall, Helen Haines, and Andrew Wilkie, as well as Centre Alliance. However, the proposition failed with members of the Morrison Government and some crossbenchers voting against it.

State/Territory 

The Australian Capital Territory is the first and only territory to have declared a climate emergency. The South Australian Parliament voted for a climate emergency in the upper house and lower house in South Australia.

Local Government 

In June 2019, Councillor Trent McCarthy of the City of Darebin brought together councillors and parliamentarians in Australia and around the world in online link-ups to facilitate collaboration between councils and governments which have declared a climate emergency. Following these link-ups and a successful motion at the National General Assembly of Local Government, McCarthy announced the formation of  Climate Emergency Australia, a new network of Australian governments and councils advocating for an emergency response to climate change.

Local government has been the most active level of government in declaring a climate emergency in Australia. Currently, every state in Australia has at least one local government jurisdiction that has declared a climate emergency. Only two capital city local governments have not declared a climate emergency: the City of Perth, which has not yet voted on a climate emergency declaration, and the City of Brisbane, which has voted against a motion to declare a climate emergency. Below is a list of local governments, showing which have declared a climate emergency, which have voted against a climate emergency, and which have not voted on a climate emergency.

New South Wales 

36 of 128 local government jurisdictions in NSW have declared a climate emergency, the highest number of any state, although Victoria has the highest percentage of councils that have declared a climate emergency.

Northern Territory 

Only one local government jurisdiction in the Northern Territory has declared a climate emergency, and that is the City of Darwin.

Queensland 

Two councils have declared a climate emergency in Queensland: Noosa Council and Sunshine Coast Council. Brisbane City Council voted against a climate emergency, one of only two capital city zones in Australia that have not declared a climate emergency.

South Australia 

16 of the 67 local government jurisdictions in South Australia have declared a climate emergency, the Town of Gawler being the first.

Tasmania 

Four councils in Tasmania have declared a climate emergency. Three councils have rejected or voted against a declaration.

Victoria 

35 of 79 Local Government jurisdictions in Victoria have declared a climate emergency, this is the highest percentage of climate emergencies declared for any state. Darebin City Council in Victoria was the first jurisdiction in the world to declare a climate emergency in 2016.

Western Australia 

11 local government jurisdictions in Western Australia have declared a climate emergency. Additionally, the Western Australian Local Government Association (WALGA) has created a Climate Change Declaration that has been signed by 40 of Western Australia's local government associations, representing 65% of the state's local jurisdictions. The Climate Change Declaration is not a declaration of a climate emergency but does mention urgent action on climate change. The Western Local Government area of the City of Perth is one of two capital city Local Government Areas that have not declared a climate emergency.

External Islands/Territories 
No external islands or territories of Australia have declared a climate emergency.

Declare Organisations in Australia 
 Planners Declare
 Builders Declare
 Architects Declare
 Comms Declare

Other Notable Non-Government Declarations 

In September 2013, the Australian Medical Association officially declared climate change a public health emergency. The AMA noted that climate change will cause "higher mortality and morbidity from heat stress; injury and mortality from increasingly severe weather events; increases in the transmission of vector-borne diseases; food insecurity resulting from declines in agricultural outputs; [and] a higher incidence of mental-ill health." The AMA has called on the Australian Government to adopt a carbon budget; reduce emissions; and transition from fossil fuels to renewable energy, among other proposals to mitigate the health impacts of climate change.

References

Politics of Australia
Environment of Australia
Climate change in Australia